Memorial Auditorium may refer to:

 Buffalo Memorial Auditorium, Buffalo, New York
 Burlington Memorial Auditorium, Burlington, Vermont
 Kitchener Memorial Auditorium Complex ("The Aud"), Kitchener, Ontario
 Memorial Auditorium (Sacramento), California
 Memorial Auditorium (Louisville, Kentucky)
 Memorial Auditorium (Moorhead, Minnesota)
 Raleigh Memorial Auditorium, part of the Duke Energy Center for the Performing Arts in Raleigh, North Carolina
 Soldiers and Sailors Memorial Auditorium, Chattanooga, Tennessee
 Soldiers and Sailors Memorial Hall, Pittsburgh, Pennsylvania
 Stanford Memorial Auditorium, Stanford University, Stanford, California
 Utica Memorial Auditorium, Utica, New York
 War Memorial Auditorium (Nashville, Tennessee), Nashville, Tennessee

See also
Veterans Memorial Auditorium (disambiguation)
War Memorial Auditorium (disambiguation)